John Adams Rollinson III (born August 3, 1950, nicknamed "Jack") is an American businessman and Republican politician who served several terms in the Virginia General Assembly representing Prince William County, Virginia in the 52nd House District.

Early and Family Life
Born in Fort Myers, Florida, Rollinson graduated from Virginia Tech with a B.A. in political science. He enlisted in the U.S. Army and served from 1972 until 1981. He married Lawrie Falck, and they had a son (John A. Rollinson IV) and a daughter (Amanda).

Career
Upon leaving the Army, Rollinson established Rollinson's Tire and Auto Service in Virginia. He became active in the Rotary Club, Freemasons, and served as director of the local Prince William County Chamber of Commerce.

Active in the local Republican party, Rollinson in 1985 defeated ten-term Democrat Floyd C. Bagley, whom the Washington Post had criticized as ineffective, and won re-election several times, surviving a December 1987 Washington Post article joking about his proposal for tree conservation legislation. Rollinson rose to chair the House Transportation Committee. Fellow Republican Jeff Frederick won the November 2003 general election to represent District 52, and thus replaced Rollinson.

References

1950 births
Living people
Republican Party members of the Virginia House of Delegates
Virginia Tech alumni
20th-century American politicians
21st-century American politicians
People from Fort Myers, Florida
People from Prince William County, Virginia